Michael Mair (born 31 August 1956) is an Italian ice hockey player. He competed in the men's tournament at the 1984 Winter Olympics.

References

External links

1956 births
Living people
Bolzano HC players
Ice hockey players at the 1984 Winter Olympics
Italian ice hockey coaches
Olympic ice hockey players of Italy
Ritten Sport players
Ice hockey people from Bolzano